Live in Philadelphia '70 is a double live album recorded by American rock band the Doors in 1970. The performance took place in The Spectrum. This is part of previously unreleased material of the Bright Midnight Archives collection of live albums by the Doors.

Track listing
All tracks written by the Doors except where noted.

Disc one
"Announcer 'Sit Down'" − 5:20
"Tuning" − 1:25
"Roadhouse Blues" (Jim Morrison) − 4:40
"Break On Through (To the Other Side)" (Morrison) − 5:12
"Back Door Man/Love Hides" (Willie Dixon, Chester Burnett/Morrison) − 6:51
"Ship of Fools" (Morrison) − 6:55
"Universal Mind" (Morrison) − 4:31
"When the Music's Over" − 14:27
"Mystery Train (Junior Parker)/Away in India" − 13:21
"Wake Up!" (Morrison) − 1:46
"Light My Fire" (Krieger, Morrison) − 11:46

Disc two
"The Concert Continues" − 0:46
"Maggie M'Gill" (Morrison) − 5:49
"Roadhouse Blues" (Reprise) (Morrison) − 2:39
"Been Down So Long / Rock Me Baby" (Morrison) (B.B. King) − 9:31
"The Music Capital of the World, Philadelphia" − 0:29
"Carol" (Chuck Berry) − 1:48
"Soul Kitchen" (Morrison) − 6:15

Personnel
Jim Morrison - lead vocals
Ray Manzarek - organ, keyboard bass, guitar ("Maggie M'Gill", "Roadhouse Blues (Reprise)", "Been Down So Long/Rock Me Baby", "Carol"), vocals
John Densmore - drums
Robby Krieger - guitar, electric bass ("Maggie M'Gill", "Roadhouse Blues (Reprise)", "Been Down So Long/Rock Me Baby", "Carol")

References

2005 live albums
Albums produced by Bruce Botnick
Bright Midnight Archives